Ortigoza is a Spanish surname. Notable people with the surname include:

 José Ortigoza (born 1987), Paraguayan football player
 Matheus Ortigoza, Brazilian football player
 Néstor Ortigoza (born 1984), Argentinian football player

See also
 Ortigosa (disambiguation)

Spanish-language surnames